"Falling into You" is a song by Canadian singer Celine Dion, recorded for her fourth English-language album, Falling into You (1996). It was released as the first single in Europe, Australia and New Zealand on 19 February 1996. In other parts of the world "Because You Loved Me" was released as the lead track instead. The song was written and recorded first by Argentine singer-songwriter Marie-Claire D'Ubaldo on her album Marie Claire D'Ubaldo (1994). "Falling into You" reached number-one in Spain and in Greece, and became a top ten hit in Norway (number eight) and in the UK (number ten). The single has sold 200,000 copies in the UK. The song became part of 1999 All the Way... A Decade of Song (Australian edition), 2000 The Collector's Series, Volume One and 2008 My Love: Essential Collection (European edition) compilation albums. Dion performed the song during her Falling into You: Around the World tour 1996/1997 and during her Celine Dion Live 2018 tour.

Background
Dion revealed the recording process of this song in her authorized biography Celine Dion : For Keeps:

Critical reception
AllMusic senior editor Stephen Thomas Erlewine marked "Falling into You" as one of the standouts on the album. Pip Ellwood-Hughes from Entertainment Focus called it "gorgeous". Caroline Sullivan from The Guardian said in her review of the album, "Only the autumnal Falling Into You and the hint-of-reggae (really) Make You Happy diverge from the mainstream". Pan-European magazine Music & Media described it as "a slow lullaby of a ballad, punctuated in the intro and outtro by Spanish guitars, martial sounding drum rolls and a Careless Whisper type sax riff." A reviewer from Music Week rated it five out of five, adding, "Less is more on this restrained, angelically sung ballad, quite possibly Dion's most beautiful yet." Christopher Smith from TalkAboutPopMusic noted that it is "sultry and schmoozy with only a hint of saxophone in the latter stages that add to the mood and sexiness of this down-tempo pop-ballad."

Music video
The music video for the song was directed by British director Nigel Dick between 18–19 January 1996 in Gorbio, France and released in February 1996. It begins in a small village. Dion plays a woman who belongs to a group of circus artists. She gets flowers on the door of her carriage, from a little boy. He obviously delivers them for a man. The card says "Bonne chance (Good luck)". Dion, now holding the flowers, begins to sing. Then she sits at the dressing table in front of a mirror. A clown helps her put on a long-haired wig. In evening, the circus is performing in front of a crowd of people. Various artists perform, while the singer stands leaning against a stone wall. Obviously sad, while she sings. Then a fire artist comes on stage and Dion assists him with handing him torchs, while he performs. In one scene, she reaches him one of them, but instead, he takes another. Dion runs off in the dark, driving away in a car. The video ends with her driving in a winding mountainside in daylight. There she meets a motorcyclist who is obviously waiting for her. Then they embrace each other. The video was uploaded to YouTube in 2011. In August 2020, it has got more than 11,700,000 views.

In March 2021, the video has been remastered in HD quality to celebrate the 25th anniversary of the album's release.

Formats and track listings

 European CD and UK cassette single
"Falling into You" – 4:18
"I Don't Know" – 4:38

 French CD single
"Falling into You" – 4:18
"Le ballet" – 4:23

 Australian/European/UK CD maxi-single
"Falling into You" – 4:18
"I Don't Know" – 4:38
"Le ballet" – 4:23

 UK CD maxi-single #2
"Falling into You" – 4:17
"If That's What It Takes" – 4:09
"The Colour of My Love" – 3:23

Charts

Weekly charts

Year-end charts

Certifications

Release history

See also
List of number-one singles of 1996 (Spain)
List of UK top-ten singles in 1996

References

External links

1996 singles
1996 songs
1990s ballads
Celine Dion songs
Columbia Records singles
Epic Records singles
Music videos directed by Nigel Dick
Number-one singles in Spain
Pop ballads
Song recordings produced by Billy Steinberg
Song recordings produced by Rick Nowels
Songs written by Billy Steinberg
Songs written by Rick Nowels
Songs written by Marie-Claire D'Ubaldo